The Santa Barbara Islanders were a professional basketball team based in Santa Barbara, California. They played only one season in the Continental Basketball Association (CBA), the defunct development league for the National Basketball Association (NBA).

History
In 1989 the CBA decided to expand the league to the West Coast, and admitted expansion teams: on May 18, 1989 the CBA board approved the addition of two teams, the San Jose Jammers and the Santa Barbara Islanders, and on June 10, 1989 it was announced that the league had admitted the two franchises. The idea of a team in Santa Barbara was already being discussed in 1987 between Shirley Otto, Bill Bertka and Craig Case, a local investor. A total of four expansion franchises entered the CBA for the 1989–90 season: in addition to the Islanders and the Jammers, the other two were the Grand Rapids Hoops and the Sioux Falls Skyforce. The league then held a 12-round expansion draft on June 22, 1989: the Islanders selected Rod Foster, Brad Wright, Herb Johnson, Cedric Henderson, Mike Phelps, Steve Burtt, Bobby Lee Hurt, Eddie Hughes, Devin Durrant, Steffond Johnson, Ron Cavenall and Larry Spriggs. Only Johnson, Cavenall, Phelps and Spriggs actually played for the team.

Sonny Allen was appointed as head coach, and Don Ford was his assistant coach; the Santa Barbara City College Sports Pavilion was chosen as the home arena. The team was assigned to the Western Division of the National Conference and debuted on November 14, 1989 at home against the Columbus Horizon, winning the game 123-113. The Islanders ran a fast offense and led the CBA in scoring through the first games of the season. They had a very successful season, ending with a 37-19 record (the fourth-best in the entire CBA), winning the Western Division and qualifying for the playoffs. Derrick Gervin led the league in scoring with a 31.7 points per game average. In the playoffs the Islanders won the National Conference semifinals against the Tulsa Fast Breakers in five games (3-2, including two overtime wins), but lost the finals against the Rapid City Thrillers in six games (4-2). On March 22, 1990 Jim Les set a CBA single game playoff record for assists in a game with 24 in a 137-133 win against the Tulsa Fast Breakers.

Despite their success on the court, the franchise had developed severe financial issues throughout the season, and debt ultimately forced the dismissal of the team from the league.

Season-by-season records

All-time roster

Luther Burks
Ron Cavenall
Brian Christiansen
Stan Easterling
Antoine Ford
Kevin Francewar
Derrick Gervin
Cedric Hunter
Craig Johnson
Steffond Johnson
Jim Les
Carlton McKinney
Mitch McMullen
Jawann Oldham
Mike Phelps
Mike Ratliff
Larry Spriggs
Rory White
Leon Wood

Sources

Awards
CBA scoring champion: Derrick Gervin

References

 
Basketball teams in California
1989 establishments in California
Continental Basketball Association teams
Sports in Santa Barbara, California
Basketball teams established in 1989
1990 disestablishments in California
Sports clubs disestablished in 1990